Leonid Ivanov may refer to:

Leonid Ivanov (basketball) (1944–2010), Soviet basketball player
Leonid Ivanov (botanist), Russian botanist
Leonid Ivanov (footballer) (1921–1990), Soviet international footballer
Leonid Ivanov (pilot) (1909–1941), recipient of the Hero of the Soviet Union
Leonid Ivanov (rower) (born 1938), Soviet Olympic rower
Leonid Ivanov (runner) (born 1937), Soviet Olympic runner
Leonid Ivanov (test pilot) (1950–1980), Soviet cosmonaut
Leonid Lavrovsky, born Ivanov (1905–1967), Russian ballet choreographer